This is a list of the television and audio serials of the British science-fiction series Sapphire & Steel.

The television series was transmitted between July 1979 and August 1982 on ITV1 and was produced by Shaun O'Riordan, with David Reid as executive. More than two decades later, an audio series was released on compact disc by Big Finish Productions. The CDs were released between May 2005 and August 2008 and were produced by Nigel Fairs and Jason Haigh-Ellery.

Television serials

Series One

Series Two

Series Three

Series Four

Audio serials 
 Regular cast: Susannah Harker as Sapphire, David Warner as Steel
 Producers: Nigel Fairs, Jason Haigh-Ellery

Series One

Series Two

Series Three

External links
 
 

Sapphire and Steel
Sapphire and Steel